USS Scarpe (SP-713) was a United States Navy patrol vessel in commission from 1917 to 1919.

Scarpe was built as a private wooden motorboat of the same name by W. S. Burgess at Marblehead, Massachusetts. On 1 May 1917, her owner, F. F. Fields of Brockton, Massachusetts, loaned her to the U.S. Navy for use as a section patrol boat during World War I. She was commissioned as USS Scarpe (SP-713) the same day.

Assigned to the 1st Naval District in northern New England, Scarpe served on patrol duty for the rest of World War I and for a short time after its conclusion.

Scarpe was returned to Fields on 16 May 1919.

Notes

References
 
 SP-713 Scarpe at Department of the Navy Naval History and Heritage Command Online Library of Selected Images: U.S. Navy Ships -- Listed by Hull Number "SP" #s and "ID" #s -- World War I Era Patrol Vessels and other Acquired Ships and Craft numbered from SP-700 through SP-799
 NavSource Online: Section Patrol Craft Photo Archive Scarpe (SP 713)

Patrol vessels of the United States Navy
World War I patrol vessels of the United States
Ships built in Marblehead, Massachusetts